The 2018 Cork Senior Football Championship was the 130th staging of the Cork Senior Football Championship since its establishment by the Cork County Board in 1887. The draw for the 2018 opening fixtures took place on 10 December 2017. The championship began on 18 March 2018 and ended on 28 October 2018.

Nemo Rangers entered the championship as the defending champions, however, they were defeated by Castlehaven at the quarter-final stage.

On 28 October 2018, St. Finbarr's won the championship following a 3-14 to 2-14 defeat of Duhallow in the final. This was their 9th championship title overall and their first title since 1985.

Team changes

To Championship

Promoted from the Cork Premier Intermediate Football Championship
 Mallow

Championship details

Overview

The 2018 championship will see a total of 27 teams compete for the title. These consist of 19 club teams, 6 divisional teams and 2 college teams.

Format

A new format will be used for the 2018 championship. For the first time since 2015, the divisions and colleges will compete in their own mini championship before entering the championship proper.

Divisional and college section

Round 1: Eight teams will contest this round. The four winning teams will advance to Round 2. The four losing teams will be eliminated from the championship.

Round 2: Four teams will contest this round. The two winning teams will advance to Round 3 of the championship proper. The two losing teams will be eliminated from the championship.

Club section

Preliminary round: 2 teams will contest this round. The winning team will advance to Round 1. The losing team will advance to Round 3.

Round 1: 18 teams will contest this round. The nine losing teams will advance to Round 2. The nine winning teams will advance to Round 3.

Round 2: The 9 losing teams from Round 1 will contest this round. The four winning teams will advance to Round 3. The four losing teams will be eliminated from the championship. One team will receive a bye to Round 3.

Round 3: The 9 winning teams from Round 1, the 4 winning teams from Round 2, the bye team and the 2 divisional teams will contest this round.  The 8 winning teams will advance to the Quarter-finals. The 8 losing teams will be eliminated from the championship.
 
Quarter-finals: 8 teams will contest this round. The 4 winning teams will advance to the Semi-finals. The 4 losing teams will be eliminated from the championship.

Semi-finals: 4 teams will contest this round. The 2 winning teams will advance to the Semi-finals. The 2 losing teams will be eliminated from the championship.

Final: The final will be contested by the two semi-final winners.

Results

Divisions/colleges section

Preliminary round

Round 1

Round 2

Relegation play-offs

Round 3

Quarter-finals

Semi-finals

Final

Championship statistics

Top scorers

Top scorers overall

Top scorers in a single game

Miscellaneous

 St. Finbarr's won the championship for the first time since 1985.

References

External link
 2018 Cork SFC fixtures and results 

Cork Senior Football Championship
Cork Senior Football Championship
Cork SFC